Egilina is a genus of sea snails, marine gastropod mollusks in the family Pyramidellidae, the pyrams and their allies.

Description
Species in this genus have strong axial ribs between the sutures which are interrupted at the periphery by a deep spiral sulcus. The intercostal spaces are smooth. The base of the shell is ornamented by spiral keels, the spaces between which are marked by many very slender axial threads.

Species
Species within the genus Egilina include:
 Egilina alicae (Hornung & Mermod, 1924)
 Egilina babellina Saurin, 1958
 Egilina callista (Melvill, 1893)
 Egilina chasteriana (Melvill, 1910)
 Egilina gigantea Saurin, 1958
 Egilina glycisma (Melvill, 1899)
 Egilina gracilis (Yokoyama, 1926)
 Egilina kotoeae Hori & Fukuda, 1999
 Egilina lamyi (Dautzenberg & Fischer, 1907)
 Egilina mariella (A.Adams, 1860)
 Egilina mariellaeformis (Nomura, 1938)
 Egilina prestoni (Dautzenberg & Fischer, 1907)
 Egilina tenuis Saurin, 1962
Synonyms
 Egilina yabei Nomura, 1936: synonym of Babella yabei (Nomura, 1936)

References

External links
 To World Register of Marine Species
 Dall W.H. & Bartsch P. (1906). Notes on Japanese, Indo-Pacific and American Pyramidellidae. United States National Museum, Proceedings, 30 (1452): 321-369, pl. 17-26

Pyramidellidae